Petit Séminaire Collège Saint-Martial (founded in 1865), is an all-boys Catholic school located in Port-au-Prince, the capital of Haiti. The school is under the control of the Holy Ghost Fathers.

History

The Concordat signed by Haiti and the Vatican in 1860 led to the school being established in 1865. Monsigneur Testard du Cosquer, of the Spiritans, acquired rights and devoted it as part of his ministry as an academic and religious school: a young institution in a young country.

According to Spencer St. John, the British consul in Haiti, Saint-Martial was the best school in the country.

Just four years after the first cinematograph was patented by the Lumière brothers, the Martial held the first motion picture projection in Haiti on 19 December 1899.

Father Daniel Weick, formed the first fire brigade in the country, and the first weather station was set up together with a National Museum, which opened in 1904.

On 15 August 1969 the Brothers of the Holy Ghost were accused by the government of Francois Duvalier of conniving with illegal political parties. They were expelled from Petit Séminaire College Saint-Martial and exiled. The Spiritans had no more direction over the school until 1995.

Secondary education at PSCSMS was beyond the ordinary. The institution was well equipped with archives and libraries, applied-science laboratories, and cleric-scientific staff to help pupils use their conventional knowledge to develop more practical applications, like technology and inventions.

Among its foremost successful alumni is Dr. Gardy Cadet, former chairman of the Haitian American Association of Engineers and Scientists. Dr. Cadet previously worked at famous laboratories such as Lucent Technologies and Bell Labs. He holds under his belt 8 US patents and 5 European patents.

National competition participation 
J'epelle au soleil 2011: second place (student:Wallens Louis)

2014: second place/student:Carl Handy Corvil

Télé-génie: several-time winner

2012 "Moi et le cholera" essay: 16th/400 /student:Beludji Narcisse

Earthquake
On 12 January 2010, a large earthquake hit Haiti. The school was totally destroyed by it. The three buildings (kindergarten, primary, and secondary school), as well as the learning center for young seminarians and the chapel library and administrative office, were all either damaged beyond repair or completely knocked down.

But though the school's buildings were hit, the students and their teachers prevailed, with lessons starting again in April 2010.

However the reputation of good formation, provided by the school is still the same.

Rebuilding the school

As part of the rebuilding effort, the first building of the Junior High section was inaugurated in September 2015.

Alumni
Jean-Claude Bajeux, human rights activist
Marc Bazin, Prime Minister and provisional President of Haiti (1992-1993)
Patrick Bellegarde-Smith, professor  
Louis Borno, President of Haiti
Gardy Cadet, engineer and scientist, former chairman of H.A.E.S
Jude Célestin, politician and mechanical engineer
Martial Célestin, first Haitian prime minister
Fritz Daguillard, writer
Louis-Philippe Dalembert, writer
Philippe Dodard, painter
Hugues Gentillon, Filmmaker, medical researcher, conceptual artist, philanthropist
Joseph Jérémie, writer
Chibly Langlois, First Haitian cardinal
François-Wolff Ligondé, former archbishop of Port-au-Prince
Charles Moravia, poet and playwright
Alexandre Paul, Haitian consul in Miami
René Préval, 51st and 54th President of Haiti (1996-2001), (2006-2011)
Lyonel Trouillot, poet and writer
Pierre Vernet, Haitian linguist and educator
Etzer Vilaire, poet and lawyer
Philippe Vorbe, soccer player

References

External links
Lenouvelliste.com
Lavie.fr
Haitiobserver.com
Books.google.ht
Books.google.ht
Spiritains.org
Spiritains.org
Petitfute.com
Lenouvelliste.com
Lenouvelliste.com

1871 establishments in Haiti
Educational institutions established in 1871
Catholic schools in Haiti
Secondary education in Haiti